Salahudin Awae (Thai สาลาฮูดิน   อาแว;, born November 1, 1983) is a Thai retired footballer. Salahudin won the league championship in 2008.

Club career
In 2010 he was signed from Muang Thong United to Buriram PEA F.C. in the Thai Premier League.

He transferred to PTT Rayong FC in 2011.

International career

On the back of performing extremely well in the Thailand Division 1 League and helping his clubside to the league championship, Salahudin was called up to the full national side in coach Peter Reid's first squad announcement. He was called up with 35 other players to the 2008 T&T Cup hosted by Vietnam.

He made his debut against North Korea on October 28, 2008 in the T&T Cup 2008.

Salahudin was a member of the victorious T&T Cup 2008 winning squad.

Honours
International
Thailand
 ASEAN Football Championship: Runners-up 2008
T&T Cup: 2008

Clubs
Thailand Division 1 League: 2008 with Muang Thong United
Thai Premier League 2009 Champions With Muang Thong United

External links

References

1983 births
Living people
Salahudin Awae
Salahudin Awae
Salahudin Awae
Salahudin Awae
Salahudin Awae
Salahudin Awae
Salahudin Awae
Association football midfielders
Salahudin Awae
Salahudin Awae